Thomas John Curry (born January 17, 1943) is an Irish-born American prelate of the Roman Catholic Church. Curry served as an auxiliary bishop of the Archdiocese of Los Angeles from 1994 to 2018. From 1994 to 2013, he was the episcopal vicar of the Santa Barbara Pastoral Region.  

Curry was forced to resign in 2013 as vicar due to his role in attempting to maintain the secrecy of sexual abuse allegations against priests in the archdiocese.

Biography

Early life 
Thomas Curry was born on January 17, 1943, in Drumgoon in County Cavan, in the Republic of Ireland. He attended University College Dublin, graduating in 1963 with a bachelor's degree in history.

Priesthood
On June 17, 1967, Curry was ordained to the priesthood by Bishop John Scanlan in Ireland at All Hallows College for the Archdiocese of Los Angeles. After his ordination in 1967, Curry served as an associate pastor at St. Bernardine of Siena Parish in Woodland Hills, California. In 1970, he started teaching at Pius X High School in Downey, California.  During this time, Curry studied at Loyola Marymount University in Los Angeles, receiving a master's degree in history in 1973.

In 1976, Curry was appointed director of the archdiocese Office of Continuing Education for Clergy. In 1978, he was a teacher for one year at St. Paul High School in Santa Fe Springs, California. He received a doctorate in history in 1983 from Claremont Graduate University in Claremont, California. In 1985, Curry was appointed as vicar for clergy.  In 1991, he was named director of the Secretariat for Church Ministerial Services.

In 1987, Curry wrote a memo to Cardinal Roger Mahony discussing how to keep secret acts of sexual abuse by priests, saying that they constituted privileged information.  The memo mentioned Michael Wempe, a priest in Ventura County, California, who was accused of "some sexual touching".  Wempe later admitted to abusing 13 boys.

Auxiliary Bishop of Los Angeles 
On February 8, 1994, Curry was appointed as titular bishop of Ceanannus Mór and as an auxiliary bishop of the Archdiocese of Los Angeles by Pope Paul II. He was consecrated on March 19, 1994, by Cardinal Mahony; his principal co-consecrators were Bishops James Ward and Armando Ochoa.

Within the United States Conference of Catholic Bishops (USCCB), Curry was chairman of the Committee for Catholic Education and consultant to The Bishops' Committee on the Liturgy. In 2000, he signed up for the USCCB's Encuentro 2000. On 28 January 2001, Curry co-celebrated a mass of dedication for San Roque Church's new altar in Santa Barbara, California with Cardinal Mahony as the principal celebrant.

In 2001, Curry wrote Farewell to Christendom: The Future of Church and State in America, in which he defined Christendom as "the system dating from the fourth century by which governments upheld and promoted Christianity" and stated that the end of Christendom came about because modern governments refused to "uphold the teachings, customs, ethos, and practice of Christianity". He argued the First Amendment to the United States Constitution and the Second Vatican Council's Declaration on Religious Freedom were two of the most important documents setting the stage for its end.

On January 23, 2013, the Archdiocese of Los Angeles released 3,000 pages of church personnel files as required by a legal settlement of a lawsuit in 2007.  The files showed that Curry had repeatedly worked to suppress the public release of information on archdiocesan priests accused of sexual assault.  Curry released a statement of apology the day after the files were released.

On February 1, 2013, Archbishop José Gómez announced Curry's resignation as head of the Santa Barbara pastoral region.  This was in response to Curry's role in aiding Cardinal Mahony in attempting to maintain the secrecy of records on abusive priests in the archdiocese.

Retirement
In January 2018, Curry turned 75 and submitted his resignation as auxiliary bishop to the Holy See, according to the procedures in Canon Law. On April 3, 2018, Pope Francis announced the acceptance of Curry's resignation.

See also
 

 Catholic Church hierarchy
 Catholic Church in the United States
 Historical list of the Catholic bishops of the United States
 List of Catholic bishops of the United States
 Lists of patriarchs, archbishops, and bishops

References

External links
Roman Catholic Archdiocese of Los Angeles official website
Profile of Curry at the Archdiocese of Los Angeles website
 Former Cardinal Mahony aide, Bishop of Santa Barbara Region, resigns, NBC/Los Angeles

Alumni of All Hallows College, Dublin
Irish emigrants to the United States
People from County Cavan
1943 births
20th-century Irish Roman Catholic priests
Living people
20th-century American Roman Catholic titular bishops
21st-century American Roman Catholic titular bishops